For Your Own Special Sweetheart is the third album by Washington D.C. post-hardcore band, Jawbox. It was produced by Ted Niceley, best known for his work with Fugazi. This would be the band's major label debut, as they had left Dischord Records to sign with Atlantic Records. It is also the first album to feature Zachary Barocas on drums, as he replaced original drummer Adam Wade two years prior. The album was not much of a commercial success, despite being well received by critics.

"Savory" was the album's first single, followed by "Cooling Card". "Motorist" and "Jackpot Plus!" had previously been released on a Dischord single and were newly recorded for this album. The album was remastered and reissued by DeSoto in 2009 with three bonus tracks (b-sides from the "Savory" single) and new cover art.

Reception 

The album received very positive reviews upon release. Greg Kot called the album "the quartet's punchiest record yet, surpassing in blowtorch clarity the group's earlier releases on Fugazi's Dischord label." He praised Ted Niceley's production, writing that it "puts a vicious gleam on Jawbox's rhythm section, particularly Kim Coletta's power-tool bass." He concluded by calling it "music of intelligence and intensity, superbly recorded."

Retrospective reviews (published mostly upon the album's reissue) have been even more positive. Jason Heller called it "the group’s crowning achievement" and "one of that decade’s most lasting, magnificent discs." Andy Kellman called the album "their peak, a thrilling collision of vibrant guitar-generated noise and off-center melodic hooks over a rhythm section that swings as easily as it pummels." "Inside or outside its D.C. epicenter," he writes, "this is one of post-hardcore’s most exceptional releases, second to whatever Fugazi album gives you the biggest charge." Matt LeMay wrote that the album "has aged exceedingly well [...] precisely because it did not pander to the aesthetic fads of its time-- mainstream or underground. Instead, Jawbox honed their sound, maximized the resources at their disposal, and made a record that hides behind no extraneous instruments, sounds, or ideologies."

"Savory" was covered by Sacramento rock band Deftones with alternative rock group Far on Deftones' B-Sides and Rarities album.

Accolades

Track listing

Personnel
All personnel as per AllMusic.

Jawbox
J. Robbins – vocals, electric guitar
Bill Barbot – electric guitar, vocals
Kim Coletta – bass guitar
Zachary Barocas – "traps" (drums)

Production
Ted Niceley – production, engineering, mixing
Tim Gregory – engineering (assistant)
Drew Mazurek – engineering
Geoff Turner – engineering, mixing
Jim Saah – photography
Shawn Scallen – photography
Katherine Davis – photography
Jason Farrell – art direction, graphic design

References 

Jawbox albums
1994 albums
Albums produced by Ted Niceley
Atlantic Records albums
DeSoto Records albums